Iveta Benešová and Květa Peschke were the defending champions but only Peschke competed that year with Émilie Loit.

Loit and Peschke won in the final 7–6(7–5), 6–4 against Cara Black and Rennae Stubbs.

Seeds
Champion seeds are indicated in bold text while text in italics indicates the round in which those seeds were eliminated.

 Cara Black /  Rennae Stubbs (final)
n/a
 Émilie Loit /  Květa Peschke (champions)
 Elena Dementieva /  Flavia Pennetta (semifinals)

Draw

External links
2006 Open Gaz de France Doubles Draw

Doubles
Open Gaz de France